Antonina Leśniewska (1866–1937), was a Polish pharmacist.  

She became the first female pharmacist with a formal degree in pharmacy in her country in 1884.

References

1866 births
1937 deaths
Polish pharmacists
Women pharmacists
19th-century Polish women scientists